John O'Sullivan (born 12 July 1980) is a rugby union player who currently plays for Agen in the French Top 14. He plays as a back row forward, preferably at number eight. He is a native of Tralee and attended Newbridge College in Co. Kildare.

He formerly played for Munster in the Celtic League. Before being recruited by his native province, O'Sullivan played for two seasons with Connacht. In the 2003–04 season he was voted Connacht's senior player of the year.
He left Munster at the end of the 2008–09 season to join Agen.

References

External links
Munster Profile

1980 births
Living people
Irish rugby union players
Connacht Rugby players
Munster Rugby players
Garryowen Football Club players
Rugby union number eights
People educated at Newbridge College
Rugby union players from County Kerry
Ireland Wolfhounds international rugby union players